"Raymond; a Fragment" is a short Gothic story published in 1799. Signed under the pseudonym Juvenis, it was reprinted, plagiarized, and served as the inspiration for other Gothic tales; it likely was inspired by a 1796 Gothic story. It is part of the genre of fragmentary writing, which uses supernatural motifs without explanation.

Plot 
Raymond is sitting at his house following the abduction of his wife, Miranda, shortly after their marriage ceremony. He hears a woman screaming, and he grabs a sword and searches for her. He enters a ruined castle, and after looking through a succession of hallways and chambers (in one, he finds a skeleton wearing armor), happens upon a man carrying a bloody knife and a dead woman. After murdering the man, he discovers the woman is Miranda.

Publication history 
"Raymond; a Fragment" appeared in the February 1799 issue of Lady's Magazine as the work of the pseudonymous Juvenis. Since they share substantial textual and plot overlap, it was likely inspired by the earlier "Sir Edmund, a Gothic Fragment" that appeared in  the June 1796 issue of European Magazine by "Fredericsberg Germanicus". Attributed to Juvenis, the story appeared in the March 1799 issue of Hibernian Magazine, an 1810 issue of The Weekly Visitor (with Miranda's name changed to Louisa), an 1821 fiction anthology, and an 1824 issue of the Western Sun & General Advertiser of Indiana; it was plagiarized with an altered title ("Albert and Albina: A Fragment") and distorted authorship around December 1799 as part of a bluebook; pieces of the text were plagiarized in an 1826 story entitled "St. Aubin and Angelina"; and an inspired short story, "Arthur Kavanagh", was printed in an issue of The Irish Shield from 1830 or 1831.

There are two modern reprints of the story: The Candle and the Tower by Robert D. Spector (1974) and The Oxford Book of Gothic Tales by Chris Baldick (1992).

The text is part of the Gothic fragment genre, which included stories like "Sir Bertrand, a Fragment" (by Anna Aikin, 1773), "Montmorenci, a Fragment" (by Nathan Drake, 1798), "Sir Edwin, A Fragment" (1800), and "Malvina" (1809). Like other stories in the genre, "Raymond; a Fragment" uses supernatural elements without explanation.

Notes and references

Notes

Citations

Works cited

 
 
 
 
 

Gothic short stories
Works originally published in The Lady's Magazine